is a passenger railway station located in the city of Katō, Hyōgo Prefecture, Japan, operated by West Japan Railway Company (JR West).

Lines
Yashirochō Station is served by the Kakogawa Line and is 24.2 kilometers from the terminus of the line at

Station layout
The station consists of two opposed unnumbered ground-level side platform connected by a level crossing. The station is unattended.

Platforms

History
It was renamed  on 22 November 1916. When the line was nationalized on 1 June 1943, the name was changed to its present name. With the privatization of the Japan National Railways (JNR) on 1 April 1987, the station came under the aegis of the West Japan Railway Company.

Passenger statistics
In fiscal 2019, the station was used by an average of 448 passengers daily

Surrounding area
 Takino Industrial Park

See also
List of railway stations in Japan

References

External links

  

Railway stations in Hyōgo Prefecture
Railway stations in Japan opened in 1913
Katō, Hyōgo